Lymania smithii is a plant species in the genus Lymania. This species is endemic to the State of Bahia in eastern Brazil.

References

smithii
Endemic flora of Brazil
Plants described in 1984